Aliya, also known as Aaliya (Punjabi) is a Pakistani film actress. She acted in both Urdu and Punjabi films and is known for her roles in films Andaleeb, Anhoni, Maula Jatt, Yeh Adam, Lado Rani and Neend Hamari Khwab Tumhare.

Early life
Aliya was born in 1948 on May 23rd in Lahore. She completed her studies from University of Lahore.

Career
She made her debut as a child actress in 1962 film Unchay Mahal. Aliya's mother Mumtaz was a producer and she worked in her mother's films. She worked in Lollywood films and appeared in films Taxi Driver, Pagri Sanbhal Jatta, Neyi Laila Neya Majnu, Teray Ishq Nachaya, Aasoo Billa, Dara and Chann Veer. Then she changed her name to Aaliya and later she appeared in films Ghairat Tay Qanoon, Zulm Da Badla, Basheera, 2 Rangeelay, Ishq Deevana and Doulat Aur Dunya. Since then she appeared in films Sher Khan, Daaman Aur Chingari, Zarq Khan, Hashu Khan, Sajjan Kamla, Jeera Sain and Noukar Tay Malik. In 1969 she starred in film Nai Laila naya Majnu with Syed Kamal, Lehri and Ilyas Kashmiri the film was a hit and she won Nigar Award of Best Supporting Actress.

Personal life
Aliya married film director Altaf Hussain but they divorced in 1979 and she took the custody of her children including a son and daughter both of them are married.

Filmography

Film

Awards and recognition

References

External links
 

1948 births
20th-century Pakistani actresses
Actresses in Punjabi cinema
Living people
21st-century Pakistani actresses
Punjabi people
Actresses in Urdu cinema
Pakistani film actresses
Nigar Award winners